Palomar 12 is a globular cluster in the constellation Capricornus, and is a member of the Palomar Globular Clusters group.  

First discovered on the National Geographic Society – Palomar Observatory Sky Survey plates by Robert George Harrington and Fritz Zwicky,
it was initially catalogued as a globular cluster; however, Zwicky came to believe it was actually a nearby dwarf galaxy in the Local Group. It is a relatively young cluster, being about 30% younger than most of the globular clusters in the Milky Way.

Based on proper motion studies, this cluster was first suspected in 2000 to have been captured from the Sagittarius Dwarf Elliptical Galaxy (SagDEG) about 1.7 Ga ago.  It is now generally believed to have originated in that galaxy and is associated with the Sagittarius Stream. It is estimated to be 6.5 Gyr old.

See also
Messier 54

References

External links

 Simbad reference data
 SEDS: Palomar 12, Capricornus Dwarf
 

Globular clusters
Sagittarius Dwarf Spheroidal Galaxy
Capricornus (constellation)
?
•
Local Group